Ipomoea tricolor, the Mexican morning glory or just morning glory, is a species of flowering plant in the family Convolvulaceae, native to the tropics of the Americas, and widely cultivated and naturalised elsewhere. The flowers are trumpet-shaped,  in diameter, most commonly blue with a white to golden yellow centre.

Heavenly blue, and many other species of morning glory, contain ergine.

Cultivation and uses
In cultivation, the species is very commonly grown misnamed as Ipomoea violacea, actually a different, though related, species. I. tricolor does not tolerate temperatures below , and so in temperate regions is usually grown as an annual. It is in any case a relatively short-lived plant. It prefers a warm, sheltered, sunny position such as a south- or west-facing wall.

Ingesting any part of the plant may cause discomfort.

Numerous cultivars of I. tricolor with different flower colours have been selected for use as ornamental plants; widely grown examples include:

 ‘Blue Star’
‘Flying Saucers’
 ‘Heavenly Blue’
 ‘Heavenly Blue Improved’
 ‘Pearly Gates’
 ‘Rainbow Flash’
 ‘Skylark’
 ‘Summer Skies’
 ‘Wedding Bells’

The cultivar 'Heavenly Blue' has gained the Royal Horticultural Society's Award of Garden Merit.

Toxic treatments aimed at discouraging entheogenic use
Commercial seeds are sometimes treated with toxic methylmercury (although the use of methylmercury has been banned in the US and the UK since the 1980s),  which serves as a preservative and a cumulative neurotoxic poison that is considered useful by some to discourage recreational use of the seeds as an entheogen (hallucinogen). There is no legal requirement in the United States to disclose to buyers that seeds have been treated with a toxic heavy metal compound. According to the book Substances of Abuse, in addition to methylmercury, the seeds are claimed to be sometimes coated with a chemical that cannot be removed with washing that is designed to cause unpleasant physical symptoms such as nausea and abdominal pain. The book states that this chemical is also toxic.

Colour change
In Ipomoea tricolor 'Heavenly Blue', the colour of the flower changes during blossom according to an increase in vacuolar pH. This shift, from red to blue, is induced by chemical modifications affecting the anthocyanin molecules present in the petals.

References

External links
Erowid Morning Glory vault

Annual plants
Entheogens
Flora of South America
tricolor
Herbal and fungal hallucinogens
Natural sources of lysergamides
Vines
Taxa named by Antonio José Cavanilles